Víctor Rasgado (1959 – 18 January 2023) was a Mexican pianist and classical composer, whose works have been performed in Mexico, the United States, Italy, and the Netherlands.

Biography
Born in Mexico City, he studied piano and composition at the Escuela Nacional de Música and the Centro de Investigación y Estudios de la Música in Mexico, the Conservatorio Giuseppe Verdi (Milan and the Accademia Chigiana (Siena). His opera Anacleto Morones was one of the winners of the Premio Orpheus for new chamber operas  and was premiered in Spoleto at the Teatro Caio Melisso on 9 September 1994 in a production by Luca Ronconi. That same year his Revontulet (Fantasia for piano, percussion, and instrumental ensemble) premiered in Siena. Other notable compositions include his 2001 children's opera,  El conejo y el coyote (The Rabbit and the Coyote) and Revuelos (for trumpet, piano, contrabass and percussion), performed in Carnegie Hall during the Sonidos de las Americas festival in 1994.

Rasgado died on 18 January 2023, at the age of 63.

See also
Paso del Norte (opera)

References

 Casa Ricordi, Catalogue: Victor Rasgado
 Ficher, Miguel, Latin American Classical Composers: A Biographical Dictionary, Scarecrow Press, 2002. 
 Holland, Bernard, "Full Circle For Mexican Festival", New York Times, 8 February 1994
 Maceda, Elda, "Duda Víctor Rasgado de foro de música", El Universal, 23 May 2000
 Paul, Carlos,  "El conejo y el coyote entusiasmó a los pequeños asistentes al Teatro Juárez", La Jornada,  26 October 2001

External links
 Official web site
 Víctor Rasgado: Cronología by Consuelo Carredano
 
 

1959 births
2023 deaths
20th-century classical composers
21st-century classical composers
Male opera composers
Mexican classical composers
Mexican classical pianists
Male classical pianists
Mexican male classical composers
Mexican opera composers
21st-century classical pianists
20th-century male musicians
21st-century male musicians
Musicians from Mexico City